Charles Alexander Jordan (born October 9, 1969) is a former American football wide receiver who played in the National Football League for seven seasons from 1993 to 1999, as well as in the XFL.

Early years
Jordan was born in Los Angeles, California, USA. His parents are Charles Jordan, Sr. and Roxie Jordan. Retired NFL wide receiver Curtis Conway is his cousin.

In addition to playing football at Morningside High School in Inglewood, California, he was a wrestler and a track star. Jordan set a CIF Southern Section 2-A State track record in the 200-meters at 21:59 in 1987, the year he graduated. He planned on playing college football at the University of Utah but felt the student/athlete challenge wasn't a good match, so he enrolled at Long Beach City College in Long Beach, California. Surgery put him on the injured reserve list, and with LBCC running an option offense that didn't match Jordan's talents, he left the program in 1988 with fellow Morningside wide receiver Alex Williams.

Jordan became a member of the Family Swans, a Bloods set. He was shot four times, and he spent time in county jail. At one point, he was charged with murder, though the charges were later dismissed. Jordan also worked as a cook at Little Rascals, his uncle's soul food restaurant in South Central Los Angeles, and assisted at his aunt's beauty salon. Eventually, Jordan decided to return to college and play out his eligibility.

Career
Invited to the Los Angeles Raiders' mini-camp for draft choices in 1993, he made the team, though he didn't play a single game for the Raiders that season. In 1994 and 1995, he played for the Green Bay Packers. In 1996, he was signed by the  Miami Dolphins as a restricted free agent, receiving a three-year, $2.6 million contract.  Coach Jimmy Johnson cut Jordan in the last of the three seasons following a November 1998 arrest after a nightclub fight that included charges of trespassing, battery on a law enforcement officer, and resisting arrest with and without violence. In his final NFL season, 1999,.he first played for the Seattle Seahawks and then returned to Green Bay.  In 2001, he joined the Memphis Maniax, an XFL team.

References

1969 births
Living people
Players of American football from Los Angeles
Los Angeles Raiders players
Green Bay Packers players
Miami Dolphins players
Seattle Seahawks players
Memphis Maniax players
American football wide receivers
Long Beach City Vikings football players